Uamh Mhòr (older spelling Uaighmor, also anglicised Uam Var) is a summit in Kilmadock parish in Stirling council area, Scotland, north of the River Teith between Callander and Doune. The name means "Great Cave", referring to a large cave in the cliff face which was a hideout for brigands into the eighteenth century.

Allusions
The stag in Canto I of Walter Scott's 1810 poem "The Lady of the Lake" flees to "the wild heaths of Uam-Var". The hero of Robert Louis Stevenson's 1886 novel Kidnapped camps by Uam Var near the end of his adventures. Michael Andrews painted "A View from Uamh Mhor" in 1990–91.

References

Mountains and hills of Stirling (council area)
Caves of Scotland